Samuel Thomas Fender (born 25 April 1994) is an English singer, songwriter, and musician. He is known for his high tenor voice and Geordie accent, layered over music characterised by a roots-orientated rock approach. Fender's sound relies primarily on his traditional American musical upbringing combined with a classic British rock sensibility. He has been acclaimed by critics and musicians for his songwriting proficiency.
	
Fender was born and grew up in North Shields. He found his vocation as a singer-songwriter around the age of 14 and subsequently released several singles independently, being named one of the BBC's Sound of 2018. Fender signed to Polydor Records and released his debut EP, Dead Boys, in November 2018. He won the Critics' Choice Award at the 39th Brit Awards and released his debut album, Hypersonic Missiles, in September 2019, which entered the UK Albums Chart at number one. His second album Seventeen Going Under was released in October 2021 and also topped the UK Albums Chart and spawned the UK hit single "Seventeen Going Under". In 2022, Fender received the Brit Award for Best British Alternative/Rock Act and the Ivor Novello Award for Best Song Musically and Lyrically.

Early life
Samuel Thomas Fender was born on 25 April 1994 in North Shields, England, to Shirley and Alan Fender. He has a brother, Liam, nine years his senior. Shirley was a nurse, and Alan was an electrician; the working class family lived in a terraced house in the suburb of North Shields. Alan is also a singer-songwriter, guitarist, and pianist, whilst Liam plays the drums. Both were musicians performing locally. Fender described the first 10 years of his life as "comfortable" within a musical family. His great-great-grandmother was Irish. His father later became a music teacher.

He had a tumultuous late childhood and adolescence. His mother abandoned him when he was eight years old, but he later returned to her after being forced out of his father's house by his stepmother. His mother was then living in the Scottish Borders, and Fender would grow up there when he visited her. At the age of eight, Fender received his first guitar from his father. He became "proficient" on the guitar at age 10 whilst being fascinated by Jimmy Page, Jimi Hendrix, and Slash. Fender attended John Spence Community High School. He was bullied for being overweight and unathletic as a child. When he was a young teen, he and his mother discovered the body of a woman they knew who died by suicide, which affected his formative years. Fender said: "Suddenly mortality became real. Life and death became concrete."

When Fender was 12, he met his friend Dean Thompson and continued to play the guitar alongside him. Over the following year, he performed for the first time in front of an audience at his brother's street performer nights, playing Hendrix covers, and accompanied by Thompson at the latter's uncle's birthday, covering songs from Kings of Leon. His ambition at this point was to become a professional musician; Fender recalled, "when I hit 13 it was the only thing I wanted from life." At the age of 14, Fender began writing his own songs. The same year, he learned to sing  by listening to Jeff Buckley's Grace, an album his brother gave him. At the age of 15, his brother introduced him to Bruce Springsteen's Born to Run and Darkness on the Edge of Town albums. Fender began playing at his brother's open mic nights and formed his first band at age 15. At the time, he and his mother were living in a small, crumbling flat within a council estate on the outskirts of North Shields and struggled to pay rent as both were poor.

Fender attended sixth form at Whitley Bay High School. He found musically-minded friends at high school. He met Joe Atkinson, and they developed a friendship through their musical interests. Fender studied theatre and A Level in English language and literature at Whitley Bay High School; however, he began to spend most of his time in the music department, although he had not studied the subject academically. He was regarded as highly popular with students and staff and engaged in school activities. Fender performed with his band for the Year 13 students finishing their time. Fighting punctuated his difficult youth, and despite his broad shoulders, he often got punched. Alan would teach him boxing to improve this situation, but the expected result was usually not obtained. At the age of sixteen, Fender entered a Teenage Cancer Trust competition where Matty Healy was a judge and won.

He grew up in an environment where North Shields was "ravaged" by the omnipresence of drugs, especially spice, also known as "zombie drug". Fender's friends were dealing marijuana, and later some switched to hard drugs such as cocaine. Social pressure had prompted him to smoke spice a couple of times, but he stopped because the experience was unsettling. However, his friends became addicted for years; Fender said, "it destroyed their lives". When he was 17, his mother had to end her 40-year career as a nurse due to fibromyalgia; he considered selling drugs to support her, but she talked him out of it. Fender idolised his father for his talent as a musician and viewed him as a tough man who struggled to provide for his children in a region facing an endemic lack of opportunities. Fender recalled that his stepfather had become homeless for more than a year after serving in the armed forces and faced difficulty escaping street life whilst struggling to find stable housing and employment.

Fender said he needed to become independent quickly. Whilst studying, Fender simultaneously held two jobs, working in a local restaurant and pub (where his manager later discovered him), and consumed alcoholic beverages daily from 17 and a half to 18, relieving him from work fatigue. He abandoned his A Levels to earn money to help his mother, who developed a mental illness in addition to her fibromyalgia. At the time, both had slipped below the poverty line. Fender's passion for music caused him to abandon his qualifications. His uncle would help them through their adversities and inconveniences, and eventually, Fender would find his outlet in music. His father was then a guitarist playing in clubs around Newcastle, and their relationship improved as they shared a common passion for music. When he was about 18, Fender began performing paid gigs at restaurants. After high school, he held several jobs, teaching guitars and working in a call centre and a bar.

Career

2013–2015: Early beginnings
At 18, Fender was spotted performing in Low Lights Tavern, the pub where he worked, by Ben Howard's manager Owain Davies, who took him on as a client. Throughout 2013, he played a series of gigs across the country supporting a number of artists including Howard and Willy Mason. At the age of 20, Fender was diagnosed with a potentially life-threatening illness, shortly after which his father moved to France. He took two years out for health reasons. He revealed years later that he has a "compromised immune system". Fender has said that prior to this time he tried to write songs that he thought would be popular as he was "desperate to do well" to get himself and his mother out of their financial and living situation. However, Fender said that having a major health scare and facing the possibility of death changed his outlook on life. His recovery refocused his songwriting efforts, and he began writing songs for himself. It was out of this period that Fender wrote a number of the songs he went on to release.

2017–2018: Singles and Dead Boys EP

In late March 2017, Fender independently released his debut single, "Play God", which premiered on BBC Radio 1. In the summer of 2017, Fender played the first shows with his band, consisting of guitarist Thompson, guitarist and keyboardist Atkinson, bassist Tom Ungerer, and drummer Drew Micheal. Throughout this period Fender toured with support slots for acts such as Bear's Den, Declan McKenna, and Michael Kiwanuka. In 2017, he put out singles "Friday Fighting" and "Start Again", which sparked a first breakthrough. In November 2017, Fender was placed on BBC's Sound of 2018 shortlist alongside Billie Eilish, Khalid, Lewis Capaldi, and winner Sigrid. The Sound of 2018 list was compiled by votes from 173 critics, festival bookers, and DJs. On 2 December 2017, he played a BBC Music Introducing session at Maida Vale Studios.

In June 2018, he signed to Polydor Records. The single "Dead Boys" was premiered as Annie Mac's Hottest Record in the World in October. The song deals with the subject of male suicide, and Fender wrote it as a reaction to losing close friends to suicide. In October 2018, Fender performed "Dead Boys" alongside "Leave Fast" on BBC's Later... with Jools Holland. "Dead Boys" would be considered Fender's first significant breakthrough song as it was the first to bring him mainstream attention. The single "Play God" would appear in the FIFA 19 video game soundtrack.

The single "That Sound" was released on 22 October 2018. His debut EP, Dead Boys, followed the next month, on 20 November 2018. The EP also featured the songs "Spice" and "Poundshop Kardashians". Alongside the EP's release, he embarked on a headline tour including three sold-out shows at the London's Omeara club and one at Newcastle University and toured with Blossoms in December. He also went on a 13-date European and Australian tour. In December 2018, Fender was selected by Vevo to be a part of its Dscvr 2019 Artists to Watch series, and he was included in The Irish News list of "Who are the ones to watch in music in 2019?".

2019–2020: Hypersonic Missiles
In January 2019, the final band line-up was completed by saxophonist Johnny "Blue Hat" Davis, who had previously worked with the Who's Roger Daltrey and the Blues Brothers' Lou Marini. In anticipation of his debut album, Fender re-released "Play God" on 14 January 2019. Fender received widespread recognition winning the Critics' Choice Award at the 2019 Brit Awards. On 26 February, he performed "Play God" in his first Live Lounge alongside a cover of Ariana Grande's "Break Up with Your Girlfriend, I'm Bored". On 6 March, Fender released a single, "Hypersonic Missiles", the forthcoming album's title track, which he described as an "unorthodox love song". In March, he performed the song on his US television debut on Jimmy Kimmel Live! He embarked on his first-ever North American tour in mid-March, including six shows at the South by Southwest festival in Texas and sold-out shows in New York City and Los Angeles.

In May, Fender made an appearance on The Graham Norton Show to promote the forthcoming album and performed at Radio 1's Big Weekend in Middlesbrough. In early July, he announced the album alongside the release of the single "Will We Talk?". After extensive touring, including playing two sold-out shows at Shepherd's Bush Empire, Fender had to cancel several gigs, including Glastonbury Festival, after experiencing severe bleeding in his vocal cords. Nevertheless, after a month of rest, he recovered sufficiently to support Bob Dylan and Neil Young in Hyde Park and set a record for the fastest-selling show at the Mouth of the Tyne Festival, where he was the headliner. All 4,000 tickets for Fender's show at Mouth of the Tyne Festival sold out within 40 minutes. On 1 August 2019, Fender was the musical guest on The Tonight Show Starring Jimmy Fallon, where he performed "Will We Talk?". Claire Shaffer of Rolling Stone wrote: "Fender is notably one of the few true singer-songwriters who's climbing the modern-day pop charts". After that, he performed at the Lollapalooza festival in Chicago and the Summer Sonic Festival in Osaka and Tokyo. The last single, "The Borders" was released two weeks prior to the album. Fender has said the song is the most personal on the album and that it shows the musical direction that he will be going in, both sonically and thematically.

Fender released his debut studio album, Hypersonic Missiles, on 13 September 2019. It topped the UK Albums Chart, outselling the rest of the top 5 combined at the mid-week mark, and sold 41,000 copies in its first week of release. The album debuted and peaked at number twelve on the Billboard Heatseekers Albums chart. On 21 September, Fender supported Liam Gallagher for a Radio X performance at the O2 Ritz in Manchester. He received the Official Charts Number 1 Award from Alan Shearer for the BBC's Match of the Day. Subsequently, he returned for a second North American tour spanning from 25 September to 20 October. On 21 October 2019, Fender appeared as the musical guest on Late Night with Seth Meyers. On 22 November, he began a headlining tour of 20 dates in the UK and Ireland, which completely sold out, including two nights at the O2 Brixton Academy and four nights at the O2 Academy Newcastle. Fender set the record for the fastest sell-out of four nights at Newcastle's O2 Academy. On 10 December 2019, "All Is on My Side" was released being described as one of his oldest songs and a staple of his live set, which didn't make it on the album. Hypersonic Missiles was certified Gold by the British Phonographic Industry (BPI) for selling over 100,000 units in the UK, three months after the album release, on 13 December 2019. It was the "fastest-selling" and the eleventh best-selling vinyl album of 2019 in the UK.

Elton John personally invited Fender to perform at his annual AIDS Foundation Academy Awards Party after the 2020 Oscars and joined him on stage for a rendition of "Will We Talk?". On 13 February 2020, the single "Hold Out" was released, which Fender said was to be the last release from the Hypersonic Missiles era. Fender was nominated for Best New Artist at the 40th Brit Awards, losing out to Lewis Capaldi. In February 2020, he undertook a headlining tour across Europe to promote the album. Fender performed in the Live Lounge playing a cover of "Back To Black" by Amy Winehouse, a previous Brit Award winner, which was later officially released. He was supposed to embark on a UK-headline tour in Spring 2020, including performances at Leeds Arena, Utilita Arena Newcastle, and Cardiff International Arena. Tickets for the London's Alexandra Palace show sold out within 20 minutes, and as a consequence, the band added a second night at the venue. It marked his first-ever headlining arena shows. However, in March, Fender was forced to reschedule the tour due to the COVID-19 pandemic.

In mid-August 2020, Fender was the first act to perform at the world's first socially distanced venue, at the Gosforth Park-based Virgin Money Unity Arena, in Newcastle. Opening the show with "Will We Talk?", he played three unreleased songs, including "The Kitchen" and "Seventeen Going Under". "Dead Boys" was nominated for a 2020 Ivor Novello Award for Best Song Musically and Lyrically. On 24 November 2020, Fender released the single "Winter Song", a cover of a 1970s track by Lindisfarne, which was premiered as Annie Mac's Hottest Record in the World. He performed the song with the Royal Northern Sinfonia at the Sage Gateshead Christmas Cracker event on 18 December. Fender declined John's invitation to collaborate on The Lockdown Sessions to focus on making his second studio album. Fender said he was "too busy" and "didn't want to rush anything". Their collaboration was then postponed to a later date. The then-forthcoming album was initially planned to be recorded at Hendrix's Electric Lady Studios in New York City before the pandemic interrupted the project.

2021–present: Seventeen Going Under

On 7 July 2021, Fender released "Seventeen Going Under" as the lead single and title track of his second studio album. The single focuses on the time Fender was seventeen and struggling to help his mother financially. Alongside this, Fender announced the tracklist of his then-forthcoming album and described it as "a coming of age story. It's about growing up. It's a celebration of life after hardship, and it's a celebration of surviving". The single debuted at number forty-four on the UK Singles Chart. The two-minute song "Howdon Aldi Death Queue" was released as a B-side that same month. After the title track was released, Fender followed it with the politically charged single "Aye", which he described as being "about the polarity between the left and the right wing". Fender embarked on a sold-out 13-date headline tour of the UK, the one initially scheduled for March and April 2020 but postponed due to the pandemic. On 8 September, he released the single "Get You Down". The single "Spit of You", released on 27 September, chronicled Fender's relationship with his father and was played in the music video by actor Stephen Graham. "Get You Down" was later featured on the FIFA 22 video game soundtrack. Fender appeared on one of three cover versions of Rolling Stones October issue of its UK edition. 

Produced by Bramwell Bronte, Seventeen Going Under was released on 8 October 2021 through Polydor Records. The album debuted at number one on the UK Albums Chart, marking Fender's second time to debut at the top spot. Seventeen Going Under shifted 44,000 copies in its first week of release, of which 79% of those were physical sales, outselling the rest of the UK's top 10 combined. The album made it Fender's highest first-week sales to date and the fifth-biggest opening week of 2021. It also topped the Official Vinyl Albums Chart and was the best-seller album in its first week in the UK's independent record shops. It debuted at number one on the Scottish Albums Chart. The album debuted (and peaked) at number 4 on the Irish Albums Chart and number 6 on the  German Albums Chart. On 15 October, Fender received a second Official Charts Number 1 Award. Fender said that "as a record, I think this one is leagues ahead of Hypersonic Missiles, I'm more proud of this than anything I've ever done. It's probably the best thing I've done in my life." It received "universal acclaim", based on the cumulative reviews on the website Metacritic. John and Paul Weller acclaimed the album. Grant Moon of Guitar World called it "a masterclass in songwriting". 

The album's front cover depicts Fender sitting on a low brick wall near an alley he often used with a group of teenagers when he was 15 to smoke marijuana in a vacant lot in Meadow Well, known for its 1991 riots and extreme poverty. Fender appeared on The Tonight Show Starring Jimmy Fallon on 10 November 2021, where a performance of "Spit of You" recorded at the Low Lights Tavern in North Shields was played. He also presented a BBC Four documentary on the life of Alan Hull, named Lindisfarne's Geordie Genius: The Alan Hull Story, which featured contributions from Sting, Elvis Costello, Mark Knopfler, Dave Stewart, and Peter Gabriel. It was broadcast by BBC Four on 26 November 2021. In December 2021, The New York Times wrote that Fender "is fast becoming one of Britain's biggest rock acts". Seventeen Going Under was the eleventh best-selling vinyl album of 2021 in the UK.

"Seventeen Going Under" peaked at number three on the UK Singles Chart in the week ending 13 January 2022, after twenty-five weeks on the chart. On 8 February 2022, he received the award for Best British Alternative/Rock Act from Ronnie Wood at the 42nd Brit Awards at the O2 Arena in London. He dedicated the win (in part) to the North East Homeless centre, which was followed by a song performed live. Furthermore, Adele held him in great esteem in her British Album of the Year acceptance speech at the Brit Awards, where he was nominated in the same category. Fender embarked on a UK-headline arena tour to support Seventeen Going Under, which began on 20 March and included shows at Wembley Arena, OVO Hydro Arena, and also 3Arena in Dublin, Ireland. Tickets for all UK arena dates, including the two nights at Wembley Arena, sold out "as soon as they went on sale". On 19 May, "Seventeen Going Under" earned Fender the Ivor Novello Award for Best Song Musically and Lyrically from the British Academy of Songwriters, Composers, and Authors. He supported the Killers on 5 and 6 June at London's Emirates Stadium. On 24 June, Fender was the last act to perform right before headliner Billie Eilish on the Pyramid Stage at Glastonbury Festival. He appeared as a special guest for the Rolling Stones at the 65,000-capacity British Summer Time Hyde Park on 3 July 2022, scheduled the day after Adele's two sold-out shows at the same place. Fender headlined a sold-out show to 45,000 people at London's Finsbury Park on 15 July 2022. It marked his largest headline show at this point. 

On 2 September 2022, Fender announced his first headline stadium show, which will be held on 9 June 2023 at Newcastle's St James' Park. As pre-sale tickets were sold out, on 7 September, he added a second show at St James' Park scheduled for 10 June 2023. On 18 October, Fender secured his first Mercury Prize nomination with Seventeen Going Under. He unveiled "Wild Grey Ocean", a song previously unreleased from Seventeen Going Under, which would later be included in the album's reissue. In November 2022, the single "Seventeen Going Under" was certified double platinum by the BPI (1.2 million UK sales).

Other endeavours

Acting 
At the age of 15, Fender acted in the pilot episode of the ITV drama series  Vera which aired in 2011. He also played the character of Dean in an episode of the fantasy series Wolfblood which first aired on CBBC in 2012. Subsequently, he put his short-lived acting career on hold, preferring to concentrate on music that depicted his own perspective rather than a script. At the end of 2021, he mentioned that he might return to acting roles in the future but added that releasing albums remained his priority. Grace Almond of Rolling Stone wrote that the music videos of "Spit of You" starring Graham and "Get You Down", where he was the leading character, highlighted Fender's acting abilities.

Modelling
In 2018, Fender first appeared in UK fashion magazines such as F Word and The Last Magazine. In April 2019, he was chosen as a model to front the "Suit Your Self" tailoring campaign for Topman. In 2019, he was featured in a GQ magazine article. Fender made an appearance at the British GQ Men of the Year Awards 2019 at Tate Modern in London. In September 2020, he was hired as the "face" of an eighteen-month motorcycle-inspired clothing campaign for British brand Barbour International and retailer Scotts Menswear. In 2021, Fender created his signature clothing line in partnership with Barbour International and launched it in April of that year via Scotts Menswear. The promotion was accompanied by a short film called On the Record, which included an interview conducted at Newcastle's Vinyl Guruh record store. As part of his modelling work, Fender has promoted branded apparel such as, Acne Studios, Frame, Harrington jacket, Martine Rose, Nike, Rag & Bone, Reiss, Champion, Levi's, Umbro, Urban Outfitters, Converse, Dr. Martens, and Dunhill.

Philanthropy
Fender has been involved in charity work. On 1 April 2020, he played a set for Isolation Nation Live on LADbible's Facebook page with an optional donation benefiting the British Red Cross to help fund emergency support during their fight against coronavirus. He was involved with the BBC Radio 1's Live Lounge All-Stars charity single alongside twenty-three acts, including Dua Lipa and Chris Martin. The charity supergroup recorded a rendition of Foo Fighters' "Times Like These" from their homes during the COVID-19 lockdowns, whose proceeds were donated to charities Children in Need, Comic Relief, and Solidarity Response Fund. The single, produced by Fraser T. Smith, first aired on 23 April 2020 and was accompanied by a music video featuring Fender and all the other acts, including members of Foo Fighters.

He released an Alan Hull cover, "Winter Song", to raise money for The Big Issue newspaper, collaborating with the social enterprise People of the Streets. Fender has said that the issue is "close to home" for him as he has "family members and friends" who have been homeless. On 4 December 2020, he launched a petition to urge all UK councils to stop phone charges for helplines for the most vulnerable groups of people in the North East of England in need of emergency assistance. Fender said it was "scandalous" that four of the seven councils serving its local community charged them 40 pence per minute. The petition was initiated as part of a nine-month campaign established jointly with the North East Homeless centre. By 21 December 2020, the petition reached 16,500 signatures, and as a result, six councils, including Durham, Gateshead, Newcastle City, North Tyneside, Northumberland, and South Tyneside, decided to drop phone charges for their helplines in favour of free-to-call numbers.

He contributed a stripped-down, live-recorded cover of Metallica's "Sad but True" for the charity tribute album The Metallica Blacklist, released in September 2021. Half of the proceeds went to Metallica's All Within My Hands Foundation, the other half to the Teenage Cancer Trust, which was Fender's choice. On 19 December 2021, he went to help out at the Newcastle West End Foodbank after being invited by The Big Issue.

In March 2022, Rega released a limited edition turntable signed by Fender as part of the Record Store Day event, whose sale proceeds have been donated to War Child UK, which raised funds to help children in plight amid the war in Ukraine. In the same month, Fender became the patron of the North East Homeless charity. On 24 May 2022, Fender performed an "intimate" show at Newcastle City Hall, aiming to raise money for the North East Homeless centre through a ballot ticketing system. The event raised  which was given by cheque onstage to the charity's founder Brian Burridge, thus enabling the centre building renovation.

Personal life
Fender began a relationship with a girl at the age of 15 and formed his first band after they broke up. He is a Newcastle United F.C. fan.

Health
Fender has ADHD, which he believes helped him focus on music. His immune system issues affected his touring. The Bristol and Birmingham shows scheduled for 5 and 6 December 2019 were postponed to January 2020 due to a "respiratory tract infection". Despite this, both shows were cancelled again in January 2020, as Fender accumulated chest infections, laryngitis, and tonsillitis. He supported the use of marijuana for medicinal purposes, which helped alleviate a friend's cancer symptoms. 

On 12 September 2022, Fender announced he was cancelling the remaining dates of his US tour to focus on his mental health. He stated, "I've neglected myself for over a year now and haven't dealt with things that have deeply affected me."

Political views
Fender holds left-wing views, but has said that the British Left had "alienated their grassroots supporters" by concentrating on identity politics, leaving the working class to "being picked up by the right". He felt that "the increasing polarisation of political discourse" is a problem that makes "debate and compromise all but impossible". Fender was also a supporter of Jeremy Corbyn, telling The Big Issue: "I loved Corbyn, quite frankly. I mean, he fucked up a lot of things. But I think his heart was in the right place and that's something that we've not seen for a long time. I just think he was done a massive disservice by the British press. And I think a lot of people who he would have potentially helped, were groomed to hate him." In July 2020, he signed an open letter, along with artists including Elton John, Dua Lipa and Olly Alexander, to the UK Minister for Women and Equalities, Liz Truss, calling for a ban on all forms of LGBT conversion therapy. In late 2021, Fender felt disillusioned by politicians and political parties, saying that his "only allegiance now is to 'people.

Wealth
In 2022, Fender entered the Sunday Times Rich List for the first time, ranking him 12th on the list of Young music millionaires in the UK, with wealth valued at £10 million ( million).

Artistry

Influences
Fender grew up in a family where his parents listened to soul, jazz, rock, and 1990s music through his brother. He cites Aretha Franklin, Donny Hathaway, Otis Redding, Joni Mitchell, Jeff Buckley, Adam Granduciel, and his father's favourite band, Steely Dan, as his early inspirations. His godfather was also a significant source of musical inspiration to him growing up; thus, visiting him, Fender would listen to songs by Mitchell and the Smiths. He also listened to 1960s rock and roll, the Spencer Davis Group, the Kinks, Joy Division, and Talking Heads growing up. Fender credited his initial interest and inspiration for songwriting to a teacher who encouraged him to enhance his writing as part of a two-year school work beginning at age 13. 

Fender names Springsteen as a major influence. Springsteen's 1975 album, Born to Run, marked a turning point in his artistic development. Besides Springsteen, well-known songs from the 1980s, such as "Fast Car" by Tracy Chapman and "Luka" by Suzanne Vega, as well as the Beatles, ABBA, and Kendrick Lamar use a writing style that Fender exclusively appreciates, thus finding himself integrated into their stylistic lineage through his musical orientation. Although Fender has said he is "a big Springsteen fan", he dismissed any comparisons—and likewise with Oasis, taking the path of affirming his own style instead. "There is no next Oasis. There was Oasis", said Fender. The Irish Times Niall Byrne echoed this view, stating that "Fender's music has retained its own sense of identity and has avoided the pitfalls of regurgitation".

Voice and musical style

Fender's music falls under the broad category of rock. He has been classified as an indie rock and British rock singer. His musical style incorporates the indie rock, heartland rock, pop rock, Americana, and post-punk genres. Fender's music nonetheless adheres to the sound of 1990s Britpop, manifested in the 2019 album Hypersonic Missiles. Classic jangle pop also defined his musical style and has been particularly recognisable on songs such as "The Borders" and the reverberant opening guitar riff of "Seventeen Going Under". "Play God" has been characterised as math rock with a dynamic groove, "Saturday" as rhythm and blues, and "That Sound" as power pop. The indie rock song "Will We Talk?", structured around abundant melodies, has been widely viewed, in essence, as rock and roll. "Last to Make It Home" has been described as an "acoustic-style ballad" with an Americana–folk rock chord structure. The motif of "Spit of You" is based on three sequences of guitar arpeggios, a Fender's trademark that he plays on the 2021 album Seventeen Going Under alongside Thompson and Atkinson, creating "movement" to the main chord progression. "Howdon Aldi Death Queue" displays an occasional penchant for punk rock. 

The Guardians Alexis Petridis opined that the second album is rooted in contemporary times and closely connected with the early 1980s period of the Jam and the Specials. Max Winkler of the Hamburg Evening Newspaper wonders if Fender is "the future of rock'n'roll", whilst Neil McCormick of The Telegraph writes that through his music, he "continues his crusade to keep Britain safe for rock'n'roll". Financial Times critic Ludovic Hunter-Tilney felt a musical approach leaning towards "classic rock" and considered Fender to have established his "authentically British version" of heartland rock as Dire Straits had done in the 1980s. The Times critic Will Hodgkinson agreed, calling it "Fender's nostalgia set to a classic rock sound". He has been dubbed "The British heartland rocker" by WFPK's Kyle Meredith. 

He is a multi-instrumentalist, playing guitar, bass, piano, synthesizer, Hammond organ, glockenspiel, harmonica, and mandolin. The characteristic features of Fender's music include the jangly guitar tone of Jazzmasters, solos, saxophone, and also horns and strings. MusicRadar has described the pulsating rhythmic sounds of Michael's drum beats as "huge" and explained that he displays "discipline and respect" for Fender's anthemic songs. Michael's drumming style has been characterised by motorik beats.

Fender is known for his high tenor voice and strong Geordie accent (North East England). His manager said he was "totally struck by this incredible voice" when Fender, then 18, began singing under the encouragement of his boss at Low Lights Tavern. Moon described his voice as "earnest" with keening harmonies. Fender has stated that he tends to sing at the top of his vocal range when writing and performing; he said, "I'm always belting." Ellie Harrison of The Independent regarded Fender's voice as "big and sonorous" and expressing "moments of vulnerability". The Telegraphs James Hall wrote that his live vocals were "rich and vibrant" in the upper register, particularly on medium tempo songs like "Mantra". Petridis observed that in ascending pitch on the song "Aye", Fender's voice "takes on the keening quality" of John Lydon.

Songwriting
Fender has been praised for his storytelling style of songwriting. Byrne argued that Fender distinguished himself as "an artist interested in expressing lived emotion" when releasing his series of singles from 2017. In 2019, Rolling Stone music columnist Tim Ingham discussed songwriting processes and reviewed the "Top 10 biggest tracks in the U.S." of recent years, saying it illustrated the "near-complete decline of the solo singer-songwriter pop hit" over the past decade, with the trend emphasising creative partnerships. He said Fender "is a rarity in the modern music industry: a major label priority act ... who entirely writes all of his own material". He told Billboard in 2019 that he was entering a phase where he was writing lyrics first: "because I really enjoy just writing poetry or just writing freeform". Fender writes most of the songs on the piano and converts them to the guitar, and then he continues the creative development to find slight variations of chords on the latter. Furthermore, he may optionally write and record songs in Elton John's house.

ABC Triple J's Al Newstead wrote that Hypersonic Missiles "introduced him as a songwriter with skill, honesty, and a great love for anthemic rock". Newstead further said that Fender "embrace the voice-of-a-generation mantle thrust upon him" on the first two albums' politically-charged songs but, by contrast, is more effective at addressing mental health-related topics and personal experiences. Moon deemed his lyrics as "powerful, poetic, personal stufftraditional songwriting with a modern edge". Fender's songwriting leans towards a direct style which he called "descriptive", imbued with reality and details, rather than a metaphorical style, exemplified in the lyrics of "The Dying Light", "This town is a world of waifs and strays, comedy giants, penniless heroes/Dead men at the bar, I drank with them all." Petridis felt he moved away from Springsteen's influence on the second album and noted a significant improvement in the lyrical department through an approach to songwriting that placed greater autobiographical emphasis with the addition of romantic, novelistic aspects.

The urban environment and local pubs' atmosphere often serve as a thematic framework for his songs. Songs provide the narrative of his personal experiences and those of his friends, ranging from "troubled childhoods", working class life in North Shields, to male suicides. The New York Times Alex Marshall wrote that through the theme of social classes depicted in his songs, Fender continues in the tradition of the Clash, Sex Pistols, Pulp, and the "Britpop battles of the 1990s"citing Oasis and Blur. His songs also addressed communication, romantic failures, and relationships—including "complicated" ones between fathers and sons. Some lyrics were about self-esteem and growing up in England, whilst others chronicled the country's political spectrum and the ensuing tensions. Others thematically refer to teenage life, friendship, mental health, poverty, "toxic masculinity", social media addiction, and "faceless" politicians. Seventeen Going Under was described as Fender "turning the mirror on himself; his adolescence and the trials and tribulations of growing up", with North Shields as "the ever-present backdrop".

In 2022, some of his lyrics are being used for English teaching to Year 9 pupils as part of the Key Stage 3 National Curriculum for England at Whitley Bay High School due to the quality of their writing and "certain messages" conveyed that "resonate with young people".

Equipment
Fender plays guitars of the same name. He began playing a Les Paul in his early days, and then the Fender brand offered to provide him with free equipment. He subsequently developed an interest in the sound of the Jazzmaster. He also uses a powder blue Stratocaster and a Takamine acoustic guitar; both are gifts from Elton John. Although his guitar was previously tuned to Eb standard, he adjusted it to his belt voice and switched to C standard. He recorded the second album tuned to C standard and Nashville tuning and used light gauge strings.

Backing band members
Current
 Dean Thompson – guitar, backing vocals 
 Tom Ungerer – bass guitar 
 Joe Atkinson – keyboards, synthesizers, guitar, backing vocals 
 Drew Michael – drums 
 Johnny "Blue Hat" Davis – saxophone 
 Mark Webb – trumpet

Discography

Studio albums
 Hypersonic Missiles (2019)
 Seventeen Going Under (2021)

Extended plays
 Dead Boys (2018)

Filmography

Awards and nominations

Notes

References

External links

  – official site
 
 

1994 births
21st-century British male singers
21st-century English singers
Brit Award winners
English male singers
English male singer-songwriters
English tenors
Ivor Novello Award winners
Living people
Musicians from Tyne and Wear
People from North Shields
Polydor Records artists